Boris Nikolayevich Livanov (– 22 September 1972) was a Soviet and Russian actor and theatre director. People's Artist of the USSR (1948). He was a member of the Moscow Art Theatre from 1924 through 1972.

Biography
Livanov was born in Moscow into a family of the well-known Russian actor Nikolai Alexandrovich Livanov (1874—1949), a Volga Cossack from Simbirsk who moved to Moscow and performed under a pseudonym of Izvolsky.

When Boris was 16, he ran away from home and joined the Red Army to fight Basmachi in Turkestan, but soon returned to Moscow and enrolled in the 4th Studio of the Moscow Art Theatre to study acting. He graduated in 1924 and became a member of the theatrical troupe. He performed in both dramatic and comedy roles; his expressive acting and wide range of emotions soon turned him into one of the leading and most respected actors. Among his notable roles were Nozdryov from Dead Souls, Chatsky from Woe from Wit, Count Almaviva from The Marriage of Figaro, Vassily Solyony from Three Sisters and others.

Livanov first appeared in cinema in 1924 as Morozko in the fairy tale adaptation of the same name. In 1927 he performed his first serious roles in two historical-revolution films: Kastus Kalinovskiy and October: Ten Days That Shook the World. During the 1930s he played Dubrovsky in the film version of Alexander Pushkin's novel Dubrovsky and Dmitry Pozharsky in the Minin and Pozharsky historical epic (he was awarded his first Stalin Prize for this role), although his most famous performance of that time was Mikhail Bocharov in the Baltic Deputy biographical movie based on the life of Kliment Timiryazev (portrayed by Nikolay Cherkasov).

With the start of the Great Patriotic War Livanov informed the administration of the theater that he was going to join the Red Army and head to war, but was told that the actors of the leading Moscow theaters couldn't be mobilized by Joseph Stalin's orders. During the Battle of Moscow his family was evacuated, yet he chose to stay in the city and perform for the soldiers at the front line.

After the war he continued his theater and movie career. He was named People's Artist of the USSR in 1948. In 1953, Livanov staged his first play Mikhailo Lomonosov as a theatre director, where he also performed the main part of Mikhail Lomonosov. In two years it was adapted into a movie by Alexandr Ivanov. Among his other works were stage adaptations of The Brothers Karamazov novel (also played Dmitri Karamazov's part), Maxim Gorky's Yegor Bulychov and Others, The Seagull by Anton Chekhov and other plays.

Livanov was married to Eugenia Kazimirovna Livanova (née Prawdzic-Filipowicz) who belonged to an old szlachta family. Their son Vasily Livanov also became a popular Russian actor, screenwriter, director of live action and animated movies. He is most famous for his portrait of Sherlock Holmes in the Soviet mini-series.

Boris Livanov was also known for drawing caricatures on everything that surrounded him. According to his son, he was so good at it that the famous trio Kukryniksy asked him to join them as the fourth artist. He left thousands of caricatures after his death. Some of them were included with the autobiographical book written by Vasily Livanov in 2013.

Livanov died in Moscow on September 22, 1972. He was buried at the Novodevichy Cemetery.

Awards
Honored Artist of the RSFSR (1933)
People's Artist of the RSFSR (1938)
People's Artist of the USSR (1948)
Order of the Badge of Honour (1938)
Four Orders of the Red Banner of Labour (1937, 1948, 1954, 1971)
Order of Lenin (1964)
USSR State Prize (1970) for the stage work
I Class Stalin Prize (1941) for Minin and Pozharsky
I Class Stalin Prize (1942) for Kremlin Сhimes
II Class Stalin Prize (1947) for Cruiser 'Varyag'
I Class Stalin Prize (1949) for Green Street
I Class Stalin Prize (1950) for Alien Shadow
Medal "For Valiant Labour in the Great Patriotic War 1941–1945"
Medal "In Commemoration of the 800th Anniversary of Moscow"

Selected filmography

References

External links
 
 To Be Remembered. Boris Livanov documentary by Leonid Filatov, 2003 (in Russian)
 Drawings and Caricatures. Boris Livanov documentary by Russia-K, 2004 (in Russian)

1904 births
1972 deaths
Burials at Novodevichy Cemetery
People's Artists of the USSR
Soviet male actors
Stalin Prize winners